Bickmore is an unincorporated community and coal town in Clay County, West Virginia, United States. Bickmore has a post office with ZIP code 25019.

References

Unincorporated communities in Clay County, West Virginia
Unincorporated communities in West Virginia
Coal towns in West Virginia